800 Pizza is an Italian pizza restaurant chain. It was founded by Alessandro D'Ubaldo in 2007, in United Arab Emirates.

History 
Alessandro D’Ubaldo opened the first 800 Pizza branch in Al Barsha (Dubai). The restaurant chain is present in Abu Dhabi, Dubai, and Ajman. 800 Pizza also owns two additional brands Pinsanity and Cluckrs, both founded by D'Ubaldo.  Pinsanity has branches in UAE and Saudi Arabia, while Cluckrs is operational in Dubai and Abu Dhabi.

In 2010, the Belhasa Group acquired a majority stake and launched its franchise operations in 2013, in partnership with Francorp ME, a subsidiary of the USA-based Francorp, Inc. In June 2018, the restaurant chain signed a deal with FIA Holdings Limited to develop and operate a new outlet in Dubai. In 2019, 800 Pizza reported a 20% growth in profit. In November 2021, 800PIZZA has been acquired by cloud kitchen operator KITOPI.

References 

Pizza chains
Pizza franchises